Manteigas is a town and a municipality in Portugal.

The municipality is located in Guarda District; in Centro Region and Beira Interior Norte Subregion. It is located in the Serra da Estrela Mountains, the highest elevation in mainland Portugal. Cities nearby: Guarda, Seia, Gouveia and Covilhã.

The municipal holiday is March 4.

Parishes
Administratively, the municipality is divided into 4 civil parishes (freguesias):
 Sameiro
 Santa Maria (Town of Manteigas)
 São Pedro (Town of Manteigas)
 Vale de Amoreira

Notable people 
 Adelino Nunes (born 1960 in Manteigas) a retired Portuguese footballer with 355 club caps and 18 for Portugal.

Climate

See also
Beira Alta

References

External links
Municipality official website
Estrela green tracks

Spa towns in Portugal
Municipalities of Guarda District
Towns in Portugal